NS35, NS 35, NS-35, NS.35, or variation, may refer to:

 NSP2 (rotavirus), a rotavirus protein also known as NS35
 Kings West (constituency N.S. 35), Nova Scotia, Canada; a provincial electoral district
 New Penguin Shakespeare volume 35

See also

 NS (disambiguation)
 35 (disambiguation)